The Pemon language (or Pemón in Spanish), is an indigenous language of the Cariban family spoken by some 30,000 Pemon people, in Venezuela's Southeast, particularly in the Canaima National Park, in the Roraima State of Brazil and in Guyana.

It covers several dialects, including Arecuna (or Arekuna), Camaracota, Camaracoto, Ingariko (or Ingarikó), Taulipang, and Taurepan (Camaracoto may be a distinct language). The Pemon language may also be known and designated informally by one of the two dialects Arecuna (or Arekuna) or Ingariko (or Ingarikó), or incorrectly under the name Kapon which normally designates another closely related small group of languages.

Pemon is one of several other closely related Venezuelan Cariban languages which also include the Macushi and Kapon (or Kapong, also sometimes used by natives to name the Pemon language itself, even if Kapon strictly covers only the two Akawaio and Patamona languages). These four languages (including Macushi) form the group of Pemongan (or Pemóng) languages. The broad Kapon (or Kapong) and selective Ingariko (or Ingarikó) terms are also used locally as a common ethnonym grouping Pemón, Akawaio, and Patamono peoples (and sometimes as well the Macushi people), and may be used as well to refer to the group of the four Pemongan (or Pemóng) languages that they speak.

Typology 

The Pemon language's syntax type is SOV with alternation to OVS.

Writing 

Pemon was an oral language until the 20th century. Then efforts were made to produce dictionaries and grammars, primarily by Catholic missionaries, specially Armellada and Gutiérrez Salazar. The Latin alphabet has been used, adding diacritic signs to represent some phonemes not existing in Spanish.

Phonology

Vowels 

Arekuna Pemon has the following vowels:

There are still texts only using Spanish characters, without distinguishing between pairs such as /o/ and /ɤ/.

Consonants 

Allophones of /s n k j/ are [tʃ ŋ ʔ ʎ].

Grammar 

Pronouns in Pemon are:

References

External links 

 Introducción al pemón (Spanish)
 Pemon for travellers
 General information about the Pemon language

Literature 
 
 Gutiérrez Salazar, Msr Mariano: Gramática Didáctica de la Lengua Pemón. Caracas 2001. .
 De Armellada, Fray Cesáreo y Olza, Jesús,s.j.: Gramática de la lengua pemón (morfosintaxis) (1999) Caracas, Publicaciones Ucab, Vicariato Apostólico del Caroní y Universidad Católica del Táchira. 289 pages.

Languages of Venezuela
Indigenous topics of the Guianas
Indigenous languages of the South American Northwest

br:Pemoneg
qu:Pemon simi